The Sprechers Mill House, also known as Salisbury, is a historic home located at Williamsport, Washington County, Maryland, United States. It is a two-story, three-bay brick structure set on low fieldstone foundations, with a one-story, two-bay brick wing also of brick construction. The home features an elaborate main entrance.

The Sprechers Mill House was listed on the National Register of Historic Places in 1978.

References

External links
, including photo from 1993, at Maryland Historical Trust

Houses on the National Register of Historic Places in Maryland
Houses in Washington County, Maryland
National Register of Historic Places in Washington County, Maryland